Eddie Rips Up the World Tour was a concert tour by Iron Maiden in 2005 based on bringing back rarities from the first four Iron Maiden albums for the younger audience (Iron Maiden, Killers, The Number of the Beast and Piece of Mind), brought about by the band's 2004 DVD The History of Iron Maiden – Part 1: The Early Days.

Background
The tour saw the band headlining several stadiums and festivals throughout Europe, with the concert at Ullevi Stadium in Gothenburg, Sweden on 9 July being broadcast live in full on both Swedish national television and radio, and co-headlining with Black Sabbath for the majority of the North American Ozzfest tour.

The final date of the US segment of the tour (Hyundai Pavilion in San Bernardino, California on 20 August 2005) ended on a sour note. Throughout the tour, vocalist Bruce Dickinson reportedly made several comments about reality television, the widespread use of autocue by current bands and the fact that Iron Maiden had headlined several dates of the tour (due to Ozzy Osbourne's illness), to which Osbourne's wife, Sharon, took offence. In addition, the PA system was shut off multiple times, cutting off power to Dickinson's microphone and the band's instruments mid-song and members of other bands were recruited to cause further disturbance, such as throwing eggs at Iron Maiden during their performance and by running on-stage with an American flag during "The Trooper". The effort to ruin the band's show seemed to have been in vain, however, as the band reportedly played even better as their performance was disrupted. Shortly after Iron Maiden's set, Sharon entered the stage to the unanimous boos from the crowd and stated that, while she loves Iron Maiden, Dickinson is a "prick."

Following the show, Iron Maiden's manager Rod Smallwood issued a statement condemning the incident.

Set
Throughout the tour, the stage was decorated with artwork lifted from The History of Iron Maiden – Part 1: The Early Days DVD release, with the runways appearing as alleyway walls and featuring ripped-up posters from that period, such as Live at the Rainbow, and a street sign reading "Acacia Avenue".

At a small number of shows, an inflatable Eddie (identical to that of the first album cover) would appear during "Iron Maiden". However, for the majority of the tour, the giant Eddie from the Give Me Ed... 'Til I'm Dead Tour was used in its place. The walk-on Eddie would also appear during "Drifter", either in a straitjacket (as on the Piece of Mind album cover) or as a replica of the original used on "The Beast on the Road" tour.

Opening acts 
 Mastodon
 DragonForce
 Dream Theater
 Marilyn Manson
 Turbonegro
 In Flames
 Nightwish
 Within Temptation

Setlist

Tour dates

N – Non Ozzfest show

Reference

References

External links
 Official website
 Eddie Rips Up the World Tour Dates

Iron Maiden concert tours
2005 concert tours